James Williams (January 16, 1906 – date of death unknown), nicknamed "Big Jim", was an American Negro league outfielder in the 1930s and 1940s. 

A native of Benton, Alabama, Williams made his Negro leagues debut in 1931 with the Indianapolis ABCs. He went on to play for several teams, and was selected to play in the 1939 East–West All-Star Game. He finished his career in 1944 with the New York Black Yankees and Jacksonville Red Caps.

References

External links
 and Baseball-Reference Black Baseball stats and Seamheads
  and Seamheads

1906 births
Place of death missing
Year of death missing
Brooklyn Eagles players
Cleveland Bears players
Homestead Grays players
Indianapolis ABCs (1931–1933) players
Jacksonville Red Caps players
New York Black Yankees players
New York Cubans players
Newark Dodgers players
Toledo Crawfords players
Baseball outfielders